Mulford Building is a historic light manufacturing loft building located in the Spring Garden neighborhood of Philadelphia, Pennsylvania.  It was built in 1912–1913, and is a nine-story, steel frame building clad in brick in the Classical Revival style.  It measures .  A four-story addition was built in 1934.  It originally housed clothing manufacturers, until purchased by the H. K. Mulford Company, pharmaceutical manufacturers, in 1918. They occupied the building until 1963, after which it again housed clothing manufacturers.

It was added to the National Register of Historic Places in 2004.

References

Industrial buildings and structures on the National Register of Historic Places in Philadelphia
Neoclassical architecture in Pennsylvania
Industrial buildings completed in 1913
Spring Garden, Philadelphia
1913 establishments in Pennsylvania
Textile mills in the United States